DC Showcase: Jonah Hex is a 2010 short animated Western superhero direct-to-video film directed by Joaquim Dos Santos and written by noted western comics writer Joe R. Lansdale, featuring the voice of Thomas Jane as disfigured bounty hunter Jonah Hex on the trail of a ruthless brothel madame who has murdered his latest quarry.

Plot
Set in the Old West, a ruthless outlaw named Red Doc who claims he can take on anyone and anything arrives in a local saloon looking for more booze and action. A prostitute named Madame Lorraine spots Red Doc and invites him upstairs as a scared bar girl looks on. Just as they get comfortable, she kills the outlaw, takes his money, and has two henchmen dispose of the body, as she has done to many men in the past.

The next day, the bounty hunter Jonah Hex arrives in the same town, spooking everyone with his disfigurement. After dealing with an arrogant young gunslinger who taunts him, Jonah goes into the saloon and asks the bartender about Red Doc, who has a $5,000 bounty on his head, though the bartender claims he never saw him. The bar girl from before informs him about Madame Lorraine, who only offers her services to men with money, who are never seen again. After paying the girl off, Hex buys drinks for the entire saloon to get Lorraine's attention. After joining her upstairs, however, Hex manages to deflect a bullet meant for him by throwing his hat. He knocks out Lorriane and fights her henchmen, quickly killing one with his gun and defeating the other in a brawl by bashing his face into a hot stove and then kicking him over a rail outside the room. The bartender, who was in on Lorraine's scheme, attempts to kill Jonah with a shotgun but is easily gunned down; Hex then announces to the patrons that their drinks are on the house.

Jonah threatens Lorraine at gunpoint to tell him where Red Doc is. Lorraine takes him to an abandoned mine and shows him a dark hole that leads to a caved-in lower shaft. She and Hex journey down, and it is revealed that Lorraine had murdered at least fifteen men for their money. As Hex finds and secures Red's body, Lorraine tries once more to kill him with a knife she found lodged in one of the bodies, but he anticipates this and knocks her out again. By the time she comes to, Hex is already outside the hole with Red. Lorraine offers to make him her new partner, but Hex responds by kicking down the rope, trapping her there. When Lorraine pleads that he can't leave her all alone, Hex responds by saying that she has plenty of companions, all of whom she knows. As Hex departs, Lorraine trembles as she stares at the corpses of her victims; the only lamp in the shaft slowly goes out, leaving her trapped in the dark.

Cast
 Thomas Jane as Jonah Hex
 Linda Hamilton as Madame Lorraine
 Jason Marsden as Young Man, Bartender
 Michael Rooker as Red Doc
 Michelle Trachtenberg as Bar Girl

References

External links

 
 DC Showcase: Jonah Hex at The World's Finest
 

Jonah Hex
2010s superhero films
2010 animated films
2010 direct-to-video films
2010 short films
American direct-to-video films
Direct-to-video Western (genre) films
2010s American animated films
2010s Warner Bros. animated short films
2010s English-language films
Jonah Hex
Films directed by Joaquim Dos Santos
Warner Bros. Animation animated short films
Western (genre) animated films
American animated short films
Warner Bros. direct-to-video films
Warner Bros. direct-to-video animated films
American Western (genre) films
2010 Western (genre) films